Welcome to Paradox was a Canadian science fiction television series aired on the Sci Fi Channel in the U.S. and subsequently on Showcase in Canada.  It was first broadcast on August 17, 1998, ran for one season, with the final episode being released November 9, 1998. As this was part of a crop of new shows produced in 1998 by Sci Fi Channel and it was not successful beyond the first season, it was never placed in syndication. Betaville was the original title for the series.

The series is an anthology hybrid. The stories all took place in the fictional future city of "Betaville", a nod to Jean-Luc Godard's Alphaville. However, the majority of the stories were adapted from short stories that were originally unconnected with that fictional city. The stories were adapted from older works by famous science fiction authors which explored the impact of certain technologies on the human body and psyche, and the theme of humanity being overwhelmed by hostile technologies. Each episode had a host—originally to be named "Paradox" until the concept was dropped—that served as a narrator, adding a prologue and epilogue to the show as with The Twilight Zone and The Outer Limits. The Volkswagen New Beetle was chosen to be the transportation of Betaville; one was used whenever a car was needed in a story.

Guest stars in the series include Steven Bauer, Roma Maffia, Ice-T, A Martinez, Nicholle Tom, Rodney Rowland, Justine Priestley, Mayim Bialik, Lochlyn Munro, Channon Roe, Henry Rollins, Alice Krige, Justin Lazard, William McNamara, and Dana Ashbrook.

Setting
Betaville, a fictional utopian city existing at an unspecified future point in time, is the setting for stories in Welcome to Paradox.  Societal problems such as crime, violence, and disease have been resolved, but there is a dark undercurrent in Betaville that impacts some citizens directly.  Episode plots highlight issues such as technology has invaded daily life to the point that simulated reality is preferred to actual reality, perfect machines wresting control from  wealthy and pampered owners, and humanity being challenged by genetic and social engineering programs that push the limits of arrogance and sanity.

Episodes

Home media
Though an Australian PAL (Region 4) boxed set of the entire series exists, the series was never released in any format in North America or Europe.  The series can be viewed in those areas through some web sites and streaming services.
In Canada it is currently streaming on the Roku channel 471-sci-fi.

References

External links

1990s Canadian science fiction television series
1990s Canadian drama television series
1998 Canadian television series debuts
1998 Canadian television series endings
1990s Canadian anthology television series
Television series by Alliance Atlantis
Showcase (Canadian TV channel) original programming
Science fiction anthology television series